Trevor Ferguson, also known as John Farrow, (born 11 November 1947) is a Canadian novelist who lived for many years in Hudson, Quebec, and he and his wife Lynne Hill Ferguson now live in Victoria, BC. He is the author of fourteen novels and four plays. He has been called Canada's best novelist both in Books in Canada and the Toronto Star.

Born in Seaforth, Huron County, Ontario in 1947, he was raised in Montreal from the age of three. In his mid-teens, he gravitated towards Canada's northwest where he worked on railway gangs, and also began to write, working at night in the bunkhouses.

In his early twenties, he travelled and worked throughout Europe and the United States before returning to Montreal to write. He settled into driving a taxi by night and writing by day until the publication of his first novel, High Water Chants, in 1977, which Dennis Lee called one of the best in the language. His second novel, Onyx John, in 1985, received (arguably) the highest critical acclaim in the history of Canadian literature. Leon Rooke called it one of the five best novels of the twentieth century. Sixteen years later, the novel would become a bestseller in France. Indeed, his work is highly regarded in France, where he's often cited as being one of the world's pre-eminent writers.
 
Extraordinary praise also awaited the publication of his third novel, The Kinkajou. The Timekeeper won the Hugh MacLennan Prize for fiction and was developed into the 2009 film The Timekeeper by Louis Bélanger. A ninth novel, River City, was published in 2011 and the paperback, at 1,000 pages, in 2012. The option for it to be a mini-series has been agreed upon, as of November, 2013. Trevor Ferguson's most recent literally novel was The River Burns, published by Simon and Schuster in 2014, the paperback in 2015. In November 2019, Ball Park under his nom de plume John Farrow was released, with a young Detective Emile Cinq-Mars set in Montreal 1975.

City of Ice, written under the penname John Farrow, has been published in 17 countries. The Vancouver Sun called the book the best ever produced in Canada in genre fiction. The second in the series, Ice Lake, caused the New York library journal Booklist to claim that the series is among the very best in crime fiction today. Die Zeit, a major cultural newspaper in Germany, declared the series the best of all time. River City was the third of the three and was equally well received. A new trilogy of John Farrow crime novels, The Storm Murders, has been sold to Thomas Dunne Books/St. Martin's Press in New York and will appear under the Minotaur imprint. The first comes out in May, 2015, under the same name, "The Storm Murders." The second. "Seven Days Dead" followed in 2016, to high praise in "The New York Times," "The Toronto Star", the "Globe and Mail", and earned a starred review in "Booklist." The third, "Perish the Day," will come out in 2017. More crime novels are to follow the trilogy.

In 2002, Trevor Ferguson's first play, Long, Long, Short, Long was produced by infinitheatre (dir. Guy Sprung) in Montreal and has become the first English play in history to be nominated by l'académie québécoise du theatre for a Masque award for best text. It returned to the stage in French in the fall of 2005, at Place des Arts in Montreal, and was seen by more than 20,000 people. His second play, Beach House, Burnt Sienna, was chosen to commemorate the tenth anniversary of Village Theatre West in Hudson in 2002. Co-produced with infinitheatre (dir. Guy Sprung), it enjoyed a highly successful run. A third play, Barnacle Wood, was produced in Montreal, also by infinitheatre, in March 2004. His fourth play, Zarathustra Said Some Things, No? opens with the Bridge Theatre Company at Studio 54 in New York City, in April, 2006. 
 
Ferguson is a past chair of the Writers' Union of Canada. He has been a writer-in-residence at the University of Alberta, an invité d'honneur at the Salon des Livres in Montreal, and he was among the Quebec authors invited as special guests of the Paris Book Fair in 1999, and to the Guadalajara Book Fair in 2003. In 2002, he was one of the few Canadian writers invited to the Festival of the Americas in Paris. Also in 2002, he served on the faculty of the May Writers' Studio at the Banff Centre for the Arts. He has frequently taught creative writing at Concordia University. In June 2019, Trevor Ferguson received an Honorary Doctorate, of Divinity, courtesy of the Vancouver School of Theology, for his work as a novelist.

Awards and honours

Publications

Novels

 High Water Chants (1977)
 Onyx John (1985)
 The Kinkajou (1989)
 The True Life Adventures of Sparrow Drinkwater (1993)
 The Timekeeper (1995)
 The Fire Line (1995)

As John Farrow 
City of Ice (as John Farrow) (1999)
Ice Lake (as John Farrow) (2001)
River City (as John Farrow) (2011)
The River Burns (2014)
The Storm Murders, (2015)
Seven Days Dead, (2016)
Perish the Day (2017)
Ball Park (2019)
Roar Back (2020)
Lady Jail (2021)

Plays
 Long Long Short Long (2002)
 Beach House, Burnt Sienna (2002)
 Barnacle Wood (2004)
 ''Zarathustra Said Some Things, No? (2006, New York; 2009, Montreal)

References

External links 
 Trevor Ferguson fonds (R11731) at Library and Archives Canada

1947 births
Living people
Canadian male novelists
20th-century Canadian novelists
21st-century Canadian novelists
21st-century Canadian dramatists and playwrights
Anglophone Quebec people
Canadian mystery writers
Writers from Montreal
People from Montérégie
Canadian male dramatists and playwrights
20th-century Canadian male writers
21st-century Canadian male writers